Mobile City is a city in Rockwall County, Texas, United States on the outskirts of Rockwall. The population was 142 at the 2020 census. It currently has the highest population density of any city in Texas, and is the only Texas city (and the smallest city in the country) with a population density of over 10,000 people per square mile.

Mobile City consists of a mobile home park, liquor store, and convenience store.

History

Originally a mobile home park outside of city limits, it was incorporated on January 25, 1990 so that a beer, wine, and liquor store could open. After incorporation, the roads through the park were paved for the first time and full-time security was provided to the residents at no charge to them. Until fall 2007 it was the only city within Rockwall County that allowed alcohol sales (excluding restaurants).

Geography

Mobile City is located at  (32.922558, –96.411114).

Demographics

As of the census of 2010, there were 188 people, 55 households, and 41 families residing in the city. The population density was 11,911.3 people per square mile (3,783.8/km). There were 60 housing units at an average density of 3,646.3 per square mile (1,158.3/km). The racial makeup of the city was 53.7% White, 1.6% African American, 0.51% Native American, 48.5% from other races, and 3.2% from two or more races. Hispanic or Latino of any race were 77.7% of the population.

There were 57 households, out of which 61.4% had children under the age of 18 living with them, 52.6% were married couples living together, 19.3% had a female householder with no husband present, and 14.0% were non-families. 8.8% of all households were made up of individuals, and none had someone living alone who was 65 years of age or older. The average household size was 3.44 and the average family size was 3.49.

In the city, the population was spread out, with 39.3% under the age of 18, 16.3% from 18 to 24, 38.3% from 25 to 44, 5.6% from 45 to 64, and 0.5% who were 65 years of age or older. The median age was 22 years. For every 100 females, there were 120.2 males. For every 100 females age 18 and over, there were 120.4 males.

The median income for a household in the city was $28,654, and the median income for a family was $28,365. Males had a median income of $27,656 versus $16,696 for females. The per capita income for the city was $8,521. None of the families and 1.2% of the population were living below the poverty line.

Education
Mobile City is served by the Rockwall Independent School District.

References

Dallas–Fort Worth metroplex
Cities in Rockwall County, Texas
Populated places established in 1990